Beaver is an unincorporated community located in the town of Beaver, Marinette County, Wisconsin, United States.

Geography

It is located along the Escanaba and Lake Superior Railroad. It is connected by road to Pound to the south and Crivitz to the north. North Branch Beaver Creek flows north of Beaver, and South Branch Beaver Creek flows south of it. The two creeks join east of Beaver to form Beaver Creek, a tributary of the Peshtigo River.

Name
Beaver was originally named Armstrong Dam in honor of Ferdinand Amesley "Pinochle" Armstrong (1834–1913), who settled there in the 1870s. Armstrong built a sawmill there and had a large residence on a  estate. The community was renamed Beaver after Beaver Creek around 1884, when the post office was established.

References

External links

Unincorporated communities in Marinette County, Wisconsin
Unincorporated communities in Wisconsin